Streum On Studio is a French video game development company based in Paris. Founded in 2007, the studio is best known for developing E.Y.E.: Divine Cybermancy, Space Hulk: Deathwing, and Necromunda: Hired Gun

History
Streum On Studio was founded in 2007 by Jonathan Cacherat, Pierrick Le Nestour and Christophe Longuépée. Prior to starting the company, the team had worked on a mod for Half-Life named "Syndicate Black Ops". According to Longuépée, the word "streum" means monster in verlan. The studio then began working on their first project titled E.Y.E.: Divine Cybermancy with a team of about 10 people. The company then partnered with Games Workshop and Focus Home Interactive to release Space Hulk: Deathwing. The studio was acquired by Focus Home in April 2021, and became Focus Home's second in-house game development studio after Deck13 Interactive. The studio continued their collaboration with Games Workshop and released Necromunda: Hired Gun in June 2021.

Games

References

External links
 

Companies based in Paris
Focus Entertainment
French companies established in 2007
Video game companies of France
Video game companies established in 2007
Video game development companies
2021 mergers and acquisitions